Each year the Tennessee Miss Basketball award is given to the person chosen as the best high school girls' basketball player in the U.S. state of Tennessee by the Tennessee Secondary School Athletic Association. A Miss Basketball is named for each of five divisions competing in Tennessee girls' basketball.

Annual Award Winners

References

High school sports in Tennessee
Mr. and Miss Basketball awards
1986 establishments in Tennessee
Women's sports in Tennessee
Basketball in Tennessee
Lists of people from Tennessee
Lists of American sportswomen
American women's basketball players
Miss Basketball